KEMP (99.3 MHz) is a commercial FM radio station broadcasting a Classic hits music format. Licensed to Payson, Arizona, United States, the station is currently owned by Kemp Broadcasting & Digital Media.

History
The station was assigned call sign KSXX on May 2, 2005. On August 31, 2005, the station changed its call sign to KMZQ, on July 30, 2008, to KMZQ-FM, and on August 19, 2014, to the current KEMP.

In 2014, KEMP began simulcasting sister station KVGQ in Overton, Nevada, part of the Las Vegas radio market.

References

External links

EMP